Plawsworth railway station served the village of Plawsworth, County Durham, England from 1868 to 1963 on the East Coast Main Line.

History 
The station opened on 1 December 1868 by the North Eastern Railway. It closed to passengers on 7 April 1952 and closed to goods traffic in 1963.

References

External links 

Disused railway stations in County Durham
Former North Eastern Railway (UK) stations
Railway stations in Great Britain opened in 1868
Railway stations in Great Britain closed in 1952
1868 establishments in England
1963 disestablishments in England